Ecarin is an enzyme that is derived from the venom of the Indian saw-scaled viper, Echis carinatus, It is the primary reagent in the Ecarin clotting time test.

References

Enzymes